Colonel Josiah Clement Wedgwood, 1st Baron Wedgwood,  (16 March 1872 – 26 July 1943), sometimes referred to as Josiah Wedgwood IV, was a British Liberal and Labour politician who served in government under Ramsay MacDonald. He was a prominent single-tax activist following the political-economic reformer Henry George.  He was the great-great-grandson of the famous potter Josiah Wedgwood.

Background
Josiah Wedgwood was born at Barlaston in Staffordshire, the son of Clement Wedgwood.  He was the great-great-grandson of the potter Josiah Wedgwood.  His mother Emily Catherine was the daughter of the engineer James Meadows Rendel.  He was educated at Clifton College and then studied at the Royal Naval College, Greenwich.

He married his first cousin Ethel Kate Bowen (1869–1952), daughter of Sir Charles Bowen, 1st Baron Bowen, in 1894 but she left him in 1913 and divorced him in 1919. Since divorce at that time required a guilty party, he agreed to take the blame and was found guilty of adultery and desertion of his wife and children, which led to criticism from the press and pulpit. More criticism was levelled after the divorce was final and he revealed that the desertion was a formality and the adultery staged. They had seven children:

Helen Bowen Wedgwood (1895–1981), married the geneticist Michael Pease, son of Edward Reynolds Pease.  One of their sons was the physicist Bas Pease and one of their daughters, Jocelyn Richenda Gammell Pease (1925–2003), married Andrew Huxley, the biologist.
Rosamund Wedgwood (1896–1960)
Francis Charles Bowen Wedgwood (1898–1959), 2nd Baron Wedgwood. He was father of the 3rd Baron.
Josiah Wedgwood V (1899–1968), managing director of Wedgwood. He was father of Dr John Wedgwood (1919–2007), former heir presumptive to the barony.
Camilla Hildegarde Wedgwood (1901–1955), anthropologist
Elizabeth Julia Wedgwood (1907–1993)
Gloria Wedgwood (1909–1974)

In 1919 he remarried; his second wife was Florence Ethel Willett (1878–1969).

Military and political career

Proficient in mathematics, he joined the workshops of an arms manufacturer, Elswick. In 1891, he was commissioned in the 1st Northumberland (Western Division, Royal Artillery). He worked for a year from 1895 as an Assistant Naval Constructor in Portsmouth before returning to Newcastle upon Tyne to head the drawing office of another arms manufacturer, Armstrong. Following the outbreak of the Second Boer War in late 1899 he was given the army rank of captain on 3 March 1900, and for three years commanded a volunteer battery of the Royal Field Artillery equipped by Elswick. He remained in South Africa after the war, spending two years as a Resident Magistrate in the district of Ermelo in the Transvaal. His studies of native land laws gave him an interest in Land Reform. Influenced by the writings of Henry George, he developed a lifelong belief in the Single Tax, advocating a tax on property to replace taxes on income and goods as a way of securing for workers the full reward for their work. He became president of the League for the Taxation of Land Values in 1908.

Having returned to England, Wedgwood was elected as Member of Parliament (MP) for Newcastle-under-Lyme at the 1906 general election. Though he stood for the Liberal Party, he made it clear that he would take an independent line in Parliament if necessary, in accordance with his conscience. He was re-elected at both the January and December 1910 elections, and that year was also elected to Staffordshire County Council, remaining a councillor until 1918. He became disillusioned with the Liberals after 1910, when it became clear that the government would not honour campaign commitments to land reform and opposing vested interests. His disillusionment was increased by the government's reaction against the Suffragettes, whom he also supported. In 1913 he staged a filibuster against the government's Mental Deficiency Bill, which he saw as authoritarian and unjust. Over the course of two days in Parliament, he tabled 120 amendments and made 150 speeches in Parliament, sustaining himself with only barley-water and chocolate according to press reports, until his voice gave out. This campaign brought him to public attention outside of his own constituency and the Land Reform movement, and he became known as a leading backbencher.

World War I
Following the outbreak of the First World War, he volunteered for service with the Royal Naval Volunteer Reserve, holding the rank of lieutenant-commander. He returned to mechanical work and was posted to the Armoured Car Section of the Royal Naval Air Service. He served in Belgium and France in 1914 with the armoured cars. He was wounded in the Dardanelles Campaign in 1915, receiving the Distinguished Service Order for his service during the landing at Cape Helles, commanding the machine guns on SS River Clyde. It was while serving at Gallipoli that he met volunteers of the Zion Mule Corps commanded by Joseph Trumpeldor that would affect his views about British policy on Palestine. Back in Parliament he expressed concern at under-staffing and support for national service, though he also defended the rights of conscientious objectors. Later that year he was posted as an army captain to the staff of General Jan Smuts in East Africa. In 1916 he was part of the Mesopotamia Commission of Inquiry.

Promoted to Major he commanded a machine gun company in the 2nd South African Infantry Brigade in 1916. In 1917 he became Assistant Director of Trench Warfare with the rank of colonel. At the start of 1918 he was sent to Siberia where his mission was to encourage continued Russian participation in the war and to gathering intelligence on Bolshevik control in Siberia.

1918 General Election
In the 1918 General Election he sought re-election. There has been some confusion regarding his specific affiliation at the time of the election. He was officially supported by his local Liberal Association and he was officially endorsed by the Coalition Government. This led to him being described in many sources at the time as a Coalition Liberal. However, during the election campaign he publicly distanced himself from the Coalition Government. His own local election campaign was minimal because he was not opposed. In his election address he stated "I come before you, the same impenitent independent radical that you first elected in 1906". This had led some to incorrectly describe him in 1918 as an 'Independent Radical' even though in 1906 he was classified as a 'Liberal'. The usually reliable F. W. S. Craig, in his book British Parliamentary Election results, 1918-1949 described him as an 'Independent Liberal'. However his status as an official Liberal rather than an Independent Liberal was subsequently confirmed when he attended the first meeting of the Liberal parliamentary party on 3 February 1919.

Joining Labour
In 1919, Wedgwood took the Labour whip in the House of Commons and joined the Independent Labour Party. He enjoyed the freer atmosphere of Labour and the party warmly welcomed him, electing him joint Vice-Chairman of the Parliamentary Labour Party in 1921. Wedgwood maintained his reputation for championing new ideas and the interests of outsiders and underdogs. He supported a number of unpopular causes, including opposition to the reparations from Germany contained in the Treaty of Versailles. In 1920 he criticised the government's partition of British territories into Palestine and Transjordan, and continued to attack what he saw as its bias against Zionism for the next two decades. That year he also led a commission from the Labour Party and the TUC to Hungary, which reported on the harsh treatment of suspected communists under the Horthy regime that succeeded the revolutionary Communist dictatorship of Béla Kun. He supported refugee causes in Britain, particularly that of anarchists from the Soviet Union, such as Emma Goldman. Most of all he became known for his support of the Indian independence movement.

Cabinet and the Lords

There was tacit co-operation between Labour and the opposition Liberals in some seats at the 1923 general election, and Wedgwood ran unopposed in Newcastle-under-Lyme. Having been re-elected Vice-Chairman of the party in 1922 and 1923, Wedgwood expected a seat in the Cabinet when Labour formed its first government at the start of 1924. There was speculation in the press that he would be made First Lord of the Admiralty and some expectation that he would become Secretary of State for the Colonies or for India. Sidney Webb believed Wedgwood would prefer to become President of the Board of Trade, and was willing to step aside in his favour. However, Ramsay MacDonald initially offered him only the junior position of Financial Secretary to the Treasury. After some pressing, MacDonald gave him a seat in the Cabinet, but with the sinecure title of Chancellor of the Duchy of Lancaster rather than a departmental portfolio. In this capacity, he performed various de facto tasks in government. Later in the year, he was appointed Chief Industrial Commissioner, succeeding Arthur Henderson in a difficult position as the government's decision to maintain some of its predecessor's policies on industrial action caused much friction within the Labour movement. He was sworn into the Privy Council in 1924.

He chaired a Cabinet Committee to contemplate the use of the Emergency Powers Act against strikes in the transport industry. He took a strong line on a number of issues, opposing disarmament and the promise of a loan to the Soviet Union. He was also wary of the state undertaking public works purely for the sake of doing so, without any utilitarian benefit.

After the fall of the government, Wedgwood publicly criticised MacDonald's leadership and Labour's reliance on civil servants. He sat on Labour's front bench in opposition, speaking on, amongst other policy areas, local government, where he encouraged Clement Attlee. He was not offered a position in the second Labour government. In March 1929, he became chairman of the House of Commons Records Committee. He began compiling a history of the Commons, a subject that consumed his interest. He wrote a history of Staffordshire's parliamentary representatives from the thirteenth century to the First World War, and two volumes of biographies of MPs of the 15th century. Wedgwood's work in this area led eventually to the establishment of the History of Parliament Trust. Throughout the 1930s, he continued to speak in the Commons on issues of importance to him, particularly the Single Tax and native resistance to colonialism. In 1930 and 1931 he was made Mayor of Newcastle-under-Lyme after successfully campaigning for the town to remain independent of Stoke-on-Trent.

From the mid-1930s he was critical of appeasement and of limitations on the migration of Jews to Palestine (1939 White Paper) and of German refugees to Britain and worked tirelessly to help European Jews. The actor Heinz Bernard's life was saved as a result of a parliamentary question asked by Wedgwood which resulted in his being given a visa to Britain.

In the Second World War, he joined the Home Guard in 1940. In 1941 he toured the United States of America, putting Britain's case against Germany at public meetings. Whilst Wedgwood was in America, Winston Churchill offered him a peerage, inviting him to sit for Labour in the House of Lords. Wedgwood accepted, resigning as MP for Newcastle-under-Lyme after 36 years and becoming Baron Wedgwood, of Barlaston in the County of Stafford on 21 January 1942. The following year he died in London at age of 71.

Zionism
Wedgwood was impressed by his contact with the Zion Mule Corps in 1915, while serving in World War I, but said that he first became aware of Zionism "as a creed" in 1916 when Dorothy Richardson invited him to address a Zionist meeting. In October 1926, Wedgwood, a devoted Zionist, visited Palestine and challenged the Mandatory government's policies in his 1928 book The Seventh Dominion, accusing the British administration of hindering the country's social and economic development.

In 1942 he prefaced the booklet STOP THEM NOW, the first public report printed in English about the non-stop destruction of the Jews in German-occupied territories, in which he says : "The Huns and the Mongols, Tamerlane with his mountains of skulls, all these demons of long ago were patterns of chivalry compared with the pureblooded devils into which Hitler has converted Germans."

Legacy and commemoration
Wedgwood Memorial College, a residential college founded in Stoke-on-Trent in 1945 was named after him.
Nachal Reuven, a moshav in central Israel, was renamed Gan Yoshiya (lit. Josiah's Garden) in his honour.
The Josiah Wedgwood, a 1946 Aliyah Bet ship (originally the Royal Canadian Navy corvette ) was named after him. The ship was later part of the Israeli Navy as INS Wedgwood (K-18).
Streets in Jerusalem, Tel Aviv and Haifa bear his name.

Arms

See also
Darwin–Wedgwood family

References

Further reading
Paul Mulvey (2010) The Political Life of Josiah C. Wedgwood: Land, Liberty and Empire, 1872-1943
J. C. Wedgwood (1940) Memoirs of a Fighting Life (autobiography)
C.V. Wedgwood (1951) Last of the Radicals
Joshua B. Stein (1992) Our Great Solicitor: Josiah C. Wedgwood and the Jews
Gabriella Auspitz (2004) My Righteous Gentile: Lord Wedgwood and Other Memories Labson

VIAG

External links 
 

Wedgwood, Josiah Wedgwood, 1st Baron
Wedgwood, Josiah Wedgwood, 1st Baron
Darwin–Wedgwood family
People educated at Clifton College
People from Barlaston
Liberal Party (UK) MPs for English constituencies
Wedgwood, Josiah Wedgwood, 1st Baron
Graduates of the Royal Naval College, Greenwich
Members of the Privy Council of the United Kingdom
Independent Labour Party MPs
Georgist politicians
Wedgwood, Josiah Wedgwood, 1st Baron
Military personnel from Staffordshire
British Army personnel of the Second Boer War
Royal Artillery officers
UK MPs 1906–1910
UK MPs 1910
UK MPs 1910–1918
UK MPs 1918–1922
UK MPs 1922–1923
UK MPs 1923–1924
UK MPs 1924–1929
UK MPs 1929–1931
UK MPs 1931–1935
UK MPs 1935–1945
UK MPs who were granted peerages
Royal Naval Air Service personnel of World War I
Royal Naval Volunteer Reserve personnel of World War I
Royal Navy officers of World War I
Members of the Parliament of the United Kingdom for Newcastle-under-Lyme
Mayors of places in Staffordshire
Labour Party (UK) MPs for English constituencies
Labour Party (UK) hereditary peers
British Zionists
Barons created by George VI
Chancellors of the Duchy of Lancaster